Hotel Room (also called David Lynch's Hotel Room) is an American drama anthology series that aired for three half-hour episodes on HBO on January 8, 1993, with a rerun the next night. Created by Monty Montgomery and David Lynch (who directed two episodes), each drama stars a different cast and takes place in hotel room 603 of the New York City-based "Railroad Hotel", in the years 1969, 1992, and 1936, respectively. The three episodes were created to be shown together in the form of a feature-length pilot, with the hope that if they were well received, a series of episodes in the same stand-alone half-hour format would be produced later. Following a lukewarm reception, HBO chose to not produce more episodes.

Plot
The series opens with the following narration, written and spoken by co-creator David Lynch: "For a millennium, the space for the hotel room existed, undefined. Mankind captured it, and gave it shape and passed through. And sometimes when passing through, they found themselves brushing up against the secret names of truth."

Each story stars a new cast, and takes place in a different year, but is confined in the room 603 of the Railroad Hotel in New York City. The same bellboy and maid appear in each story, as if they do not age.

Cast

Guest 
Episode 1
 Glenne Headly as Darlene
 Freddie Jones as Louis "Lou" Holchak
 Harry Dean Stanton as Moe Boca
Episode 2
 Griffin Dunne as Robert
 Deborah Unger as Sasha
 Mariska Hargitay as Tina
 Chelsea Field as Diane
Episode 3
 Crispin Glover as Danny
 Alicia Witt as Diane

Recurring 
 Clark Heathcliff Brolly as Sean the Bellboy
 Camilla Overbye Roos as Maid

Production
Barry Gifford wrote and Lynch directed the first and third episodes; Lynch had previously adapted Gifford's Wild at Heart novel to film. Jay McInerney wrote and James Signorelli directed the second. The series was produced by Deepak Nayar, who worked with Lynch on Wild at Heart, Twin Peaks: Fire Walk with Me and On the Air, and executive produced by Monty Montgomery and Lynch. This was Peter Deming's second collaboration as cinematographer with Lynch after On the Air. The music was composed, conducted and orchestrated by frequent Lynch collaborator Angelo Badalamenti, while Lynch was responsible for the sound design.

According to Gifford, HBO was trying to emulate the success of the anthology series Tales from the Crypt, but "wanted sexier or comedic pieces, not serious sex and not satire exactly, but something else."

Gifford wrote five scripts, of which HBO produced two. He retained the rights to all five, and has turned them into plays that have been performed in several U.S. states. The teleplays for "Tricks" and "Blackout", along with the unproduced "Mrs. Kashfi", which HBO deemed too controversial, have been published in a book by the University Press of Mississippi. "Blackout" was written in just two days, to replace a script by David Mamet that Montgomery was dissatisfied with. Gifford's script was only 17 pages long, but Lynch's cut of it came in at 47 minutes, by far the longest of the three episodes. HBO aired a truncated version of it, but the VHS release contains the longer, and director's preferred, version.

Episodes

Release

Broadcast
Hotel Room was broadcast on HBO on January 8, 1993, at 11 pm, and again on January 9, at 12 pm. In its first broadcast, it rated first in its time slot on HBO.

Home media
The three episodes of the anthology were released on VHS by Worldvision Enterprises. In Japan, a LaserDisc with English audio and burned-in Japanese subtitles was released by Pony Canyon. Bootleg DVDs captured from these sources also exist.

Reception
The New York Times wrote: "David Lynch has long raised suspicions that his work would be most at home on late-night television, but Hotel Room indicates otherwise. This setbound omnibus drama, produced by Mr. Lynch and featuring three weak episodes set in the New York City hotel room of the title, plays like a listless visit to a Lynch-style Twilight Zone where stories go nowhere, anecdotes are pointlessly bizarre and lame quips are echoed emptily, as if banality were a form of wit." Newsday had a similar opinion: "Even if you're a diehard Twin Peaks freak who's incorrigibly wild at heart, you'll be itching to check out of this 90-minute trilogy (premiering tonight at 11) long before the door finally closes on the tedious doings in Room 603 of the Railroad Hotel in New York City." Variety was a little more positive about the third episode: "With the exception of a fine performance by Alicia Witt and a few intriguing moments, the episodes are flat and wooden, lacking the fascinating darkness of Lynch's other work." The Los Angeles Times wrote that although it wouldn't become a hit, Lynch fans would enjoy it: "As you might expect with the talent involved, this is the Grand Hotel not quite so much of the twilight zone as of hell itself, definitely not for the tastes of typical travelers but a marvelously absorbing stay for the Lynch true-faithful, at least."

See also
 Room 104, another HBO series with a similar premise, which premiered in 2017

References

External links
 Hotel Room introduction, episode info, pictures, teleplay info at The City of Absurdity site

 Hotel Room episode guide on AboutLynch.com
 Hotel Room episode guide on AboutLynch.com

 

HBO original programming
1990s American drama television series
1993 American television series debuts
1993 American television series endings
Television series by CBS Studios
Television series created by David Lynch
English-language television shows
Films set in hotels
Television series by Universal Television